State Route 193 (SR 193) is a  long state highway that serves the Port of Wilma in Whitman County, located in the U.S. state of Washington.

Route description

SR 128 turns east towards Lewiston, Idaho, Idaho and SR 193 travels west on the Wawawai Road parallel to the Snake River and the Great Northwest Railroad to the Port of Wilma, carrying a daily average of 1,600 vehicles in 2011. The highway ends at a private gravel road and the roadway continues downstream as the Wawawai Road to Wawawai County Park.

History
The Wawawai area was a community for Chinese laborers working on nearby farms located on the Snake River, founded in 1875. The community was serviced by the Snake River Valley Railroad that connected Lewiston, Idaho to Washington state. The Wawawai Road was an unpaved dirt road by the 1960s, before the Port of Wilma was established and built. SSH 3G became SR 193 during a highway renumbering and was signed in 1970.

Early plans to extend the highway to US 195 near Pullman in the 1970s were never acted on due to a lack of funds. The Red Wolf Crossing opened on October 19, 1979, providing a high-level crossing of the Snake River for SR 193 after the construction of the Lower Granite Dam. Since 1991, no major revisions to the highway's route have occurred.

Major intersections

References

External links

Highways of Washington State

193
Transportation in Whitman County, Washington